Autoroute 28 is a French mainland motorway linking Abbeville in the Somme to Tours in Indre-et-Loire. The motorway starts at Abbeville, splitting from the A16 and, after merging with the A13 near Rouen, ends at Tours, merging with the A10. It is 405 km long. The motorway between Rouen and Tours was added to the Schéma Directeur Routier National in 1987.

Between Abbeville and Rouen, the first part, the motorway was built by the Ministry of Public Works and Transport. This portion of the motorway, 97 km long, is toll-free.

Between Rouen and Alençon, the second part, the motorway is operated by Alis (partly owned by Sanef) and is the first autoroute of France to have had offers by European companies following the withdrawal of the SAPN in 1998 despite its contract initiated in 1995. The second stretch of road, opened on 27 October 2005, is 125 km long and passes over two large viaducts; the Viaduc de la Risle and the Viaduc du Bec.

The third and final stretch of road, between Alençon and the A10 near Tours, is operated by Cofiroute. A portion of road between Écommoy and Tours was prevented from being built due to the presence of a protected species of beetle, Osmoderma Eremita, or the Pique Prune. Construction began only in 2004, and the stretch was opened on 14 December.

List of junctions

External links
A28 autoroute in Saratlas

A27